Alexis Pinturault (born 20 March 1991) is a French World Cup alpine ski racer and Olympic medalist.

With 34 World Cup victories, Pinturault is the most successful French skier in World Cup history. He represented France at seven World Championships and three Winter Olympics, with four bronze medals in the giant slalom. He was the overall World Cup champion in 2021.

Pinturault is double combined world champion in 2019 and 2023, the world champion in the team event in 2017, and a two-time world junior champion in giant slalom in 2009 and 2011.

Early years
Born in Moûtiers, Savoie, Pinturault grew up in Annecy. His mother, Hege Wiig Pinturault, is from Bergen, Norway, and he spent many of his childhood summers in Norway at Hestnesøy, near Grimstad. He has dual citizenship.

Ski racing career
A week before his 18th birthday, Pinturault made his World Cup debut in March 2009 in Åre, Sweden. His first podium came two years later in March 2011, a runner-up finish in giant slalom in Kranjska Gora, Slovenia. That fall, he was also a runner-up at Sölden in October 2011 and gained his first World Cup victory in February 2012, in the parallel slalom in Moscow, Russia.

2013 season
Pinturault was unable to make the season start in Sölden in October 2012, as he injured his ankle while playing tennis and had to pause for three months. In December, he won his second World Cup race in slalom at Val-d'Isère, where he thrilled the home fans with a brilliant second run under the floodlights to rise from sixth place. He convincingly beat Germany's Felix Neureuther by half a second and future World Cup champion Marcel Hirscher, who led by 0.57 seconds after the first run. Pinturault's third win was at the super-combined in Wengen, Switzerland, where his superior slalom skills were key. After placing 22nd in the downhill portion, he finished 1.15 seconds ahead of Ivica Kostelić of Croatia. The training run for the downhill portion was his first time on downhill skis for months, as he missed pre-season speed training after surgery on his left ankle in August to repair ligaments damaged while playing tennis. Pinturault did not medal at the world championships in 2013 but had four top-six finishes. A week later, he claimed a fourth World Cup win, his first in giant slalom, at Garmisch, Germany. Being second after the first run, Pinturault's total time was 0.60 seconds ahead of runner-up Hirscher. On 15 March, he was honored as the 2013 Longines Rising Star, as the top young racer (under 23) of the season.

Pinturault changed equipment after the 2014 season, from Salomon to Head.

World Cup results

Season titles
 6 titles – (1 overall, 1 Giant slalom, 4 Combined)

Season standings

Race victories

Podiums

Including both parallel slalom and parallel giant slalom.  Two parallel events have been classified in the sk-db.com results as classic events (the City Event slalom on 23/02/16 and the parallel GS on 18/12/17).  They are shown here as parallel events.

World Championship results

Olympic results

See also
 List of FIS Alpine Ski World Cup men's race winners

References

External links
 
 
  

1991 births
French male alpine skiers
Alpine skiers at the 2014 Winter Olympics
Alpine skiers at the 2018 Winter Olympics
Alpine skiers at the 2022 Winter Olympics
Olympic alpine skiers of France
Medalists at the 2014 Winter Olympics
Medalists at the 2018 Winter Olympics
Olympic medalists in alpine skiing
Olympic silver medalists for France
Olympic bronze medalists for France
French people of Norwegian descent
Norwegian people of French descent
Sportspeople from Savoie
Living people
Université Savoie-Mont Blanc alumni